Güveçli is a village in the Bingöl District, Bingöl Province, Turkey. The village is populated by Kurds of the Kejan tribe and had a population of 1,268 in 2021.

The hamlets of Karaca and Yaprak are attached to the village.

References 

Villages in Bingöl District
Kurdish settlements in Bingöl Province